Seo Gyeong-seok (born April 9, 1970) is a South Korean sprint canoer who competed in the late 1980s. At the 1988 Summer Olympics in Seoul, he was eliminated in the repechages of the K-4 1000 m event.

External links

1970 births
Living people
Canoeists at the 1988 Summer Olympics
Olympic canoeists of South Korea
South Korean male canoeists